

Automobiles

Motorcycles

Aircraft
 HA-420 HondaJet
 Honda MH02 (experimental aircraft)

Honda